Amelie Kober (born 16 November 1987, in Bad Aibling) is a German Federal Police officer and Olympic medalist in snowboarding.

Biography
At the Junior World Championships 2005 in Zermatt, Switzerland she won silver. In the World Cup she was ranked fifth.

She was the youngest competitor in the Parallel Giant Slalom competition at the 2006 Winter Olympics in Turin, Italy. Despite a fall during the quarter finals, she caught up with her competitor and proceeded to the semi-finals and final round, winning silver.

At the FIS Snowboarding World Championships 2007 in Arosa, Switzerland she won silver in the Parallel Giant Slalom competition.

She won the Parallel Giant Slalom competition of the 2009–10 FIS Snowboard World Cup in Sudelfeld, Germany.

Personal life
Kober tells in an interview after the half final of the Snowboard Competition at 2010 Winter Olympics that she is pregnant: "It's true that this season I will not compete more than one race because I'm a mum."

References

External links
 
 
 
 

1987 births
Living people
People from Bad Aibling
Sportspeople from Upper Bavaria
German female snowboarders
Olympic snowboarders of Germany
Olympic silver medalists for Germany
Olympic bronze medalists for Germany
Snowboarders at the 2006 Winter Olympics
Snowboarders at the 2010 Winter Olympics
Snowboarders at the 2014 Winter Olympics
Olympic medalists in snowboarding
Medalists at the 2006 Winter Olympics
Medalists at the 2014 Winter Olympics